"Amulet" is an electronic–world music song performed by Belgian singer Natacha Atlas and Moroccan-French band Sawt el Atlas. The song was written by Natacha Atlas, Count Dubulah, Hamid ManTu and Alex Kasiek and produced by Transglobal Underground for Atlas' second album Halim (1997).

Formats and track listings
These are the formats and track listings of major single releases of "Amulet".

CD single
(NAT86CD)
 "Amulet" (Edit) - 3:59
 "Amulet" (16B Productions) - 8:31
 "Amulet" (Aywah remix) - 5:32
 "Andeel" (Atlas) - 5:55

Vinyl single
(NAT86T)
 "Amulet" (Edit) - 3:59
 "Amulet" (16B Productions) - 8:31
 "Amulet" (Aywah remix) - 5:32
 "Andeel" - 5:55

Personnel
The following people contributed to "Amulet":

Natacha Atlas - lead vocals
Sawt el Atlas - vocals
Ahmed Mansour, Wa'el Abubakr - violin
Simon Walker - violin, viola
Keith Clouston - oud
Lazarus Whelan - keyboards, clarinet, ney, saxophone
Alex Kasiek - backing vocals, keyboards, programming, lute, strings arrangements 
Tim Garsaayid - goblet drum, riq, drums, ney, mizmar
Hamid Mantu - drums, programming, dulcimer
Count Dubulah - guitar, bass guitar, programming, string arrangements 
David White - engineering

References

External links
Official website

1997 singles
Electronic songs
Natacha Atlas songs
1997 songs
Songs written by Natacha Atlas
Beggars Banquet Records singles